Carlos Villarías (7 July 1892 – 27 April 1976) was a Spanish actor who was born in Córdoba, Spain, and died in California, United States. His most famous role is in the title role of the  Spanish-language version of Dracula (1931), with Barry Norton and Lupita Tovar, filmed at night on the same sets as the English-language version starring Bela Lugosi.

Selected filmography 
 Dracula (1931)
 Road of Hell (1931)
 The California Trail (1933)
 The Mystery of the Ghastly Face (1935)
 Mis dos amores (1938)
 Frontiers of '49 (1939)
 La Inmaculada (1939)
 Summer Hotel (1944)
 Gran Hotel (1944)
 The Museum of Crime (1945)
 The Private Life of Mark Antony and Cleopatra (1947)
 Adventure in the Night (1948)
 Zorina (1949)
 Lola Casanova (1949)

References

External links 

1892 births
1976 deaths
People from Córdoba, Spain
Spanish male film actors
20th-century Spanish male actors
Spanish male silent film actors
Spanish emigrants to the United States